The Agano Party is a political party in Kenya. It was founded in 2006. The current Party Leader is David Mwaure Waihiga, a lawyer by profession.

Electoral history

Presidential elections

References

2006 establishments in Kenya
Political parties established in 2006
Political parties in Kenya